Jean Perillier, also Périllié was a French Consul in Salé Morocco in the 17th century, from 1683 to 1689. He succeeded Henri Prat, who was Consul in Salé from 1648 to 1682, and was himself succeeded by Jean-Baptiste Estelle in 1689.

See also
 France-Morocco relations

References

17th century in Morocco
17th-century French diplomats
France–Morocco relations
People from Salé
Place of birth missing
Place of death missing
Year of birth missing
Year of death missing